Siti Nurshuhaini Azman (born 1 September 2004) is a Malaysian badminton player. Her best result was being the runner-up of the women's singles event in the 2021 Czech Open. She was nominated to represent Malaysia in the 2020 Uber Cup.

Personal life
Siti was born into a family of badminton players and took up the sport at the age of five, with six out of seven of her siblings being players who have made a name for themselves on the local scene. One of her siblings, Muhammad Nurfirdaus Azman, is also currently a doubles player in the national senior team. She used to train under her father who is the founder and coach of Azman Amman Badminton Academy.

Achievement

BWF International Series (2 runners-up) 
Women singles

  BWF International Challenge tournament
  BWF International Series tournament
  BWF Future Series tournament

References

External links 
 

2004 births
Living people
People from Selangor
Malaysian people of Malay descent
Malaysian Muslims
Malaysian female badminton players
Competitors at the 2021 Southeast Asian Games
Southeast Asian Games competitors for Malaysia
21st-century Malaysian women